Palaeoscolex is the type genus of the Palaeoscolecid worms, and served as a wastebasket taxon. until its taxonomy was revised and many of its taxa assigned to Wronascolex.

The type and only unequivocal species is P. piscatorum, known from mid-trunk segments.

References 

Prehistoric protostome genera
Paleoscolecids